Cédric Berthelin (born 25 December 1976 in Courrières) is a retired French football player and currently the goalkeeper coach of Charleroi.

Career
Berthelin started his professional career with RC Lens in 1999 and spent two seasons with the sang et or (literally blood and gold) making only occasional first team appearances. During the 2001/2 season he played for ASOA Valence. Berthelin signed for Crystal Palace in January 2003 on a free transfer following a brief period at Luton Town.
After 6 months, he was offered a 2-year contract and played regularly for the first XI. An appearance at Liverpool for Crystal Palace in an FA Cup match bought him to national attention as Palace won 2-0 with Berthelin in outstanding form.

He lost his place shortly after Ian Dowie became manager of Crystal Palace and was a non playing member of the side that gained promotion via the 1st Division Play Off Final in 2003/4 season. Berthelin did not make any further first team appearances for Palace during their first year back in the top division of English football and left during the season to join RAEC Mons of Belgian Jupiler League where he was appointed to the coaching team. He spent three and a half seasons with Mons (seasons 2004/5/6/2007) appearing in ninety league games for them before moving to Verbroedering Dender in the Belgian Top Division aka Jupiler League in January 2008. At the start of the 2009-10 season he moved again to R.E. Mouscron

When R.E. Mouscron collapsed in December 2009, Berthelin found himself without a club. He stopped briefly at his old club RC Lens where he was employed on a non contractual basis. He then joined another of his ex clubs RAEC Mons for whom he was a regular for the next three seasons and for whom he made over one hundred and thirty league appearances. 

He joined Oostende at the end of the 2012-13 season as a goalkeeper coach and reserve keeper behind Mulopo Kudimbana. In the 2013-14 season he played a number of first team league games for Oostende, but after they signed Didier Ovono in November 2013, Berthelin chose to retire from playing continuing as a goalkeeper coach. Subsequently, in June 2015, he was hired as a goalkeeper coach at K.V. Kortrijk in West Flanders in Belgium.

On 1 July 2019 Berthelin signed with R. Charleroi S.C. as a goalkeeper coach.

References

1976 births
Living people
People from Courrières
French footballers
French expatriate footballers
English Football League players
RC Lens players
ASOA Valence players
Luton Town F.C. players
Crystal Palace F.C. players
R.A.E.C. Mons players
K.V. Oostende players
Association football goalkeepers
F.C.V. Dender E.H. players
Royal Excel Mouscron players
Ligue 2 players
Belgian Pro League players
Challenger Pro League players
Expatriate footballers in Belgium
Expatriate footballers in England
Sportspeople from Pas-de-Calais
Footballers from Hauts-de-France
French expatriate sportspeople in Belgium
French expatriate sportspeople in England